Roger Vaughan (1834–1883) was an English Benedictine monk of Downside Abbey and Roman Catholic Archbishop of Sydney, 1877–1883.

Roger Vaughan may also refer to:

Sir Roger Vaughan of Bredwardine (died 1415), Welsh knight, killed at the Battle of Agincourt
Sir Roger Vaughan of Tretower (died 1471), Welsh knight, son of Sir Roger Vaughan of Bredwardine and Welsh noblewoman Gwladys ferch Dafydd Gam
Sir Roger Vaughan of Porthamal, Welsh knight, MP for Breconshire, 1553–1562, 1571, and Brecon, 1562–1567
Roger Vaughan (of Clyro), Welsh politician